The Gatter Mountains are a large, hill range up to about  and just under 50 km² in area in the province of Upper Bavaria in Germany. They lie near the town of Sankt Wolfgang in the counties of Erding and Mühldorf am Inn.

The German names, Gattergebirge and Gatterberg(e) are often seen colloquially as interchangeable. With height differences of no more than around 160 metres, the landscape does not really appear mountainous, but more like a prominent range of hills made from terminal moraines. They are known in Sankt Wolfgang as "the Tuscany of Upper Bavaria".

References 
 

Mountain ranges of Bavaria